The Greek C Basket League, or Greek C Basketball League is the national fourth-tier level of the basketball league system in Greece. It is also known as the Third National Championship, C National Championship, Third National League, C National League, and Fourth Division, or in Greek, Γάμμα Εθνική καλαθοσφαίρισης (Gamma Ethniki Basketball). It is organized by the Hellenic Basketball Federation (E.O.K.).

It began in the 1985–86 season, and originally took place with a league format of two groups. Currently, the league consists of six groups, with an overall total of 66 teams.

Champions

References

External links
Hellenic Basketball Federation 
Greek C Basket League

Greek C Basket League
4
Greece
Sports leagues established in 1985
Professional sports leagues in Greece